Jack Kramer defeated Frank Parker 4–6, 2–6, 6–1, 6–0, 6–3 in the final to win the men's singles tennis title at the 1947 U.S. National Championships.

Seeds
The seeded players are listed below. Jack Kramer is the champion; others show the round in which they were eliminated.

  Jack Kramer (champion)
  John Bromwich (semifinals)
  Frank Parker (finalist)
  Jaroslav Drobný (semifinals)
  Tom Brown (quarterfinals)
  Dinny Pails (fourth round)
  Gardnar Mulloy (quarterfinals)
  Colin Long (fourth round)
  Bill Talbert (first round)
  Torsten Johansson (fourth round)
  Pancho Segura (quarterfinals)
  Geoffrey Brown (fourth round)
  Robert Falkenburg (quarterfinals)
  Bill Sidwell (third round)
  Eddie Moylan (fourth round)
  Vladimír Černík (third round)
  Vic Seixas (fourth round)
  Enrique Morea (third round)
  Earl Cochell (first round)
  Bernard Destremau (third round)

Draw

Key
 Q = Qualifier
 WC = Wild card
 LL = Lucky loser
 r = Retired

Finals

Earlier rounds

Section 1

Section 2

Section 3

Section 4

Section 5

Section 6

Section 7

Section 8

References

External links
 1947 U.S. National Championships on ITFtennis.com, the source for this draw

Men's Singles
1947